Emeke Ossai  is a Nigerian film actor. He won the Best Supporting actor award at the 4th Africa Movie Academy Awards for his performance in the movie "Checkpoint". he is of the opinion that the new Nollywood lacks credibility.

Personal life
Ossai is a native of Ndokwa from Kwale, Utagba-Uno in Ndokwa-West local government of Delta State. He studied Food Technology at the University of Agriculture, Ogun State.

Filmography
Checkpoint
One Life
Women at Large
Greatest Weapon
Occultic Wedding
Greatest Weapon
''Executive Mess'

References

External links
 

Male actors from Delta State
Best Supporting Actor Africa Movie Academy Award winners
Living people
Year of birth missing (living people)
Nigerian film actors
Nigerian television personalities